Elsa may refer to:

ELSA (acronym)
ELSA Technology, a manufacturer of computer hardware
English Language Skills Assessment
English Longitudinal Study of Ageing
Ethical, Legal and Social Aspects research
European Law Students' Association
European League of Stuttering Associations
Evangelical Lutheran Synod of Australia, a group in the history of the Lutheran Church of Australia
Experimental light-sport aircraft (E-LSA)

People
 Elsa (given name), a female given name
 Pedro Elsa (1901–unknown), Argentine Olympic athlete

Characters
 Elsa of Brabant, a character in the 1850 Richard Wagner opera Lohengrin
 Elsa (Frozen), fictional character from the Disney animated franchise, Frozen

Places
 Elsa, California, a place in California, U.S.
 Elsa, Texas, U.S.
 Elsa, Yukon, Canada

Other
 182 Elsa, an asteroid
 Elsa (album), debut album of Elsa Lunghini
 Elsa (river), Tuscany, Italy
 Elsa the lioness, subject of the book and film Born Free
 Storm Elsa, 13–20 December 2019
 The abbreviation for × Elearethusa, an orchid genus
 Hurricane Elsa, Category 1 Atlantic hurricane in 2021

See also
 Elsa & Fred (disambiguation)
 
 Else (disambiguation)